Southern Outlet can refer to:

Southern Outlet, Hobart, a highway in Hobart, Tasmania
The northern section of the Midland Highway, in Launceston, Tasmania